Night Comes Too Soon is a 1948 British horror film directed by Denis Kavanagh and starring Valentine Dyall, Anne Howard and Alec Faversham. It was based on the story The Haunters and the Haunted by Edward Bulwer-Lytton. It was released in the United States under the alternative title of The Ghost of Rashmon Hall.

The film was made as a second feature for release on the lower half of a double bill. It was shot at a manor house near Mill Hill, part of a trend of renting country houses rather than studio space by low-budget producers after the Second World War.

Cast
 Valentine Dyall as Dr. George Clinton 
 Anne Howard as Phyllis 
 Alec Faversham as John 
 Howard Douglas
 Beatrice Marsden as Mrs. Paxton 
 Arthur Brander
 Anthony Baird as Lionel Waddell 
 Frank Dunlop
 David Keir as The Realtor 
 Monti DeLyle as Ghost of Rinaldo Sabata 
 Nina Erber as Ghost of Marianna Sabata 
 John Desmond as Ghost of The Sailor

References

Bibliography
 Chibnall, Steve & McFarlane, Brian. The British 'B' Film. Palgrave MacMillan, 2009.

External links

1948 films
British horror films
1948 horror films
Films set in country houses
Films set in England
Films based on works by Edward Bulwer-Lytton
British black-and-white films
1940s English-language films
1940s British films